Kalachiki is a rural locality (a khutor) in Bolshevistskoye Rural Settlement, Yelansky District, Volgograd Oblast, Russia. The population was 86 as of 2010.

Geography 
Kalachiki is located on Khopyorsko-Buzulukskaya Plain, 62 km south of Yelan (the district's administrative centre) by road. Bolshevik is the nearest rural locality.

References 

Rural localities in Yelansky District